This is a list of Menorcan beaches:

Beaches by municipality

Ciutadella

Cala Pilar
Algaiarens
Platja d'es Bots
Cala Morell
Cala en Forcat
Cala en Blanes
Cala des Frares
Sa Caleta
Cala Santandría
Sa Caleta den Gorries
Cala Blanca
Cala en Bosc
Son Xoriguer
Son Saura
Es Talaier
Cala en Turqueta
Macarelleta
Macarella

Ferreries

Cala Galdana
Cala Mitjana
Cala Trebalúger
Ets Alocs

Es Mercadal

Arenal d'en Castell
Son Parc
Arenal de Son Saura
Arenal de Tirant
Binimel·là
Cala Pregonda
Cavalleria Beach

Es Migjorn Gran
Binigaus
Cala Escorxada
Cala Fustam
Sant Tomás

Alaior
Son Bou
Cala En Porter
Cala Llucalari

Mahón
Cala Binidalí
Cala es Murtar
Cala Mesquida Beach
Es Grau

Sant Lluís

Binisafúller
Binibeca Beach
Cala Torret
Biniancolla
Punta Prima Beach
Alcalfar

Es Castell
Cala Padera
Cala Rafalet

External links

Beaches of Menorca
Beaches of Menorca
Beaches of Menorca
BalearicIslands.com: Beaches of Menorca

See also
List of beaches in Spain
Beaches in Ferrol, Spain
List of beaches

 
Menorca
Beaches of the Balearic Islands
Beaches, Menorca